Copenhagen Trophy is an annual figure skating competition held in Copenhagen, Denmark around March or April in senior, junior, and novice categories.

Senior medalists

Men

Ladies

Junior medalists

Junior men

Junior ladies

Novice medalists

Novice men

Novice ladies

References

Figure skating in Denmark
Figure skating competitions